Baron Talbot is a title that has been created twice. The title was created first in the Peerage of England. On 5 June 1331, Sir Gilbert Talbot was summoned to Parliament, by which he was held to have become Baron Talbot.

The title Lord Talbot, Baron of Hensol, in the County of Glamorgan, was created in the Peerage of Great Britain in 1733 for Charles Talbot, a descendant of John Talbot, 2nd Earl of Shrewsbury (the 8th Baron of the first creation), the Earl Talbot.

Barons Talbot (1331)
Gilbert Talbot (1276–1346), Lord Chamberlain of the Household to King Edward III, was summoned to Parliament as Lord Talbot in 1331, which is accepted as evidence of his baronial status at that date.

Ancestry
He was descended from Richard Talbot, a tenant in 1086 of Walter Giffard at Woburn and Battledsen in Bedfordshire. The Talbot family were vassals of the Giffards in Normandy. Hugh Talbot, probably his son, made a grant to Beaubec Abbey, confirmed by his son Richard Talbot in 1153. This Richard (died 1175) is listed in 1166 as holding three fees of the Honour of Giffard in Buckinghamshire. He also held a fee at Linton in Herefordshire, for which his son Gilbert Talbot (died 1231) obtained a fresh charter in 1190. Gilbert's grandson Gilbert (died 1274) married Gwenlynn Mechyll, daughter and sole heiress of the Welsh Prince Rhys Mechyll, whose armorials the Talbots thenceforth assumed in lieu of their own former arms. Their son Sir Richard Talbot, who signed and sealed the Barons' Letter, 1301 held the manor of Eccleswall in Herefordshire in right of his wife Sarah, sister of William de Beauchamp, 9th Earl of Warwick. In 1331 Richard's son Gilbert Talbot (1276–1346) was summoned to Parliament, which is considered evidence of his baronial status.

Succession
The first baron's grandson, the 3rd Baron Talbot, died in Spain supporting John of Gaunt's claim to the throne of Castile. Richard, the fourth Baron, married Ankaret, 7th Baroness Strange of Blackmere, daughter and heiress of John le Strange, 4th Baron Strange of Blackmere. In 1387, during his father's lifetime, Richard 4th Baron was summoned to Parliament as Ricardo Talbot de Blackmere in right of his wife. His son [Gilbert], the fifth Baron, also succeeded his mother as eighth Baron Strange of Blackmere.

On the early death of the 5th Baron, the titles passed to his daughter, Ankaret, the sixth and ninth holder of the titles. However, she died a minor and was succeeded by her uncle, John seventh Baron Talbot. John married Maud Nevill, 6th Baroness Furnivall, and, in 1409, he was summoned to Parliament in right of his wife as Johann Talbot de Furnyvall. In 1442 John was created Earl of Shrewsbury in the Peerage of England and in 1446 Earl of Waterford in the Peerage of Ireland.

Barons Talbot (1733)
The title was created in 1733 when Charles Talbot was raised to the Peerage of Great Britain as Lord Talbot, Baron of Hensol, in the County of Glamorgan. He was eldest the son of William Talbot, Bishop of Oxford, of Salisbury and of Durham and a descendant of Sir Gilbert Talbot (died 1518), third son of John Talbot, 2nd Earl of Shrewsbury.

The title fell into abeyance between the three daughters of Gilbert Talbot, 7th Earl of Shrewsbury until the deaths of two of them without issue.

List of titleholders

Barons Talbot (1331)
Gilbert Talbot, 1st Baron Talbot (1276–1346)
Richard Talbot, 2nd Baron Talbot (c. 1305–1356)
Gilbert Talbot, 3rd Baron Talbot (c. 1332–1387)
Richard Talbot, 4th Baron Talbot (c. 1361–1396)
Gilbert Talbot, 5th Baron Talbot, 8th Baron Strange of Blackmere (c. 1383–1419)
Ankaret Talbot, 6th Baroness Talbot, 9th Baroness Strange of Blackmere (died 1421)
John Talbot, 1st Earl of Shrewsbury, 1st Earl of Waterford, 7th Baron Talbot, 10th Baron Strange of Blackmere (1387–1453) (created Earl of Shrewsbury in 1442)
John Talbot, 2nd Earl of Shrewsbury, 2nd Earl of Waterford, 8th Baron Talbot, 11th Baron Strange of Blackmere, 7th Baron Furnivall (1413–1460)
John Talbot, 3rd Earl of Shrewsbury, 3rd Earl of Waterford, 9th Baron Talbot, 12th Baron Strange of Blackmere, 8th Baron Furnivall (1448–1473)
George Talbot, 4th Earl of Shrewsbury, 4th Earl of Waterford, 10th Baron Talbot, 13th Baron Strange of Blackmere, 9th Baron Furnivall (1468–1538)
Francis Talbot, 5th Earl of Shrewsbury, 5th Earl of Waterford, 11th Baron Talbot, 14th Baron Strange of Blackmere, 10th Baron Furnivall (1500–1560)
George Talbot, 6th Earl of Shrewsbury, 6th Earl of Waterford, 12th Baron Talbot, 15th Baron Strange of Blackmere, 11th Baron Furnivall (1528–1590)
Gilbert Talbot, 7th Earl of Shrewsbury, 7th Earl of Waterford, 13th Baron Talbot, 16th Baron Strange of Blackmere, 12th Baron Furnivall (1552–1616)
abeyant 1616–1651
Alethea Howard, 14th Baroness Talbot, 17th Baroness Strange of Blackmere, 13th Baroness Furnivall née Talbot (died 1654)
Thomas Howard, 5th Duke of Norfolk, 15th Baron Talbot (1627–1677)
Henry Howard, 6th Duke of Norfolk, 16th Baron Talbot (1628–1684)
Henry Howard, 7th Duke of Norfolk, 17th Baron Talbot (1655–1701)
Thomas Howard, 8th Duke of Norfolk, 18th Baron Talbot (1683–1732)
Edward Howard, 9th Duke of Norfolk, 19th Baron Talbot (1685–1777)
abeyant since 1777

List of co-heirs

Barons Talbot (1733) of Hensol
Charles Talbot, 1st Baron Talbot (1685–1737)
William Talbot, 2nd Baron Talbot (1710–1782) (created Earl Talbot in 1761)
John Talbot, 3rd Baron Talbot (1749–1793) (created Earl Talbot in 1784)
''For subsequent holders see Earl Talbot

See also
Earl of Shrewsbury
Earl Talbot
Baron Talbot of Malahide

Sources

Patrick Cracroft-Brennan, Talbot, Baron (E, 1332 – abeyant 1777), Cracroft's Peerage. Accessed 18 March 2012.

References

 
Baron
1331 establishments in England
1733 establishments in Great Britain
Abeyant baronies in the Peerage of England
Noble titles created in 1331
Noble titles created in 1733
Peerages created for the Lord High Chancellor of Great Britain